Men's and Women's Artistic Gymnastics have been contested at the Pan American Games since the 1951 edition. In 1987, Rhythmic Gymnastics was introduced. In 2007, Trampoline was added to the program.

Editions

Events

All-time medal table

Artistic gymnastics 
Includes medals earned in artistic gymnastics, rope climbing and club swinging events

Rhythmic gymnastics
Includes medals earned in individual and group events

Trampoline
Includes medals earned in trampoline and tumbling

Combined total

See also
 List of Pan American Games medalists in gymnastics
 Pan American Gymnastics Championships
 Gymnastics at the Central American and Caribbean Games
 Gymnastics at the South American Games
 South American Gymnastics Championships

References

 
Sports at the Pan American Games
Pan American Games
Pan American Games
Pan American Games